Granman (Ndyuka language: gaanman) is the title of the paramount chief of a Maroon nation in Suriname and French Guiana. The Ndyuka, Saramaka, Matawai, Aluku, Paramaka and Kwinti nations all have a granman. The paramount chiefs of Amerindian peoples in Suriname are nowadays also often called granman.

The word comes from the Sranan Tongo language, a creole spoken in Suriname, and is derived from grand + man meaning "most important man." Granman was also used for the governors of Suriname. The word can be used in combination with other words: granman-oso (big man house) is the Presidential Palace.

Government
The paramount chief of a tribe is the granman.  Below the granman are the kabitens (captains) followed by the basiyas (aldermen). The stam lanti consists of all the kabitens and basiyas who meet at least once a year under the authority of the granman and decide the policy for the entire tribe.

A village has a lo lanti (council) consisting of the kabitens and basiyas of the village who are advised by a council of elders. The lo lanti acts as the local government. In case of important decisions, the whole village participates (krutu) and a decision is taken on the basis of consensus.

Government is based on unwritten rules and regulations called gwenti which are not all powerful. If decision cannot be reached, a lanti krutu (general meeting) is called consisting of the village elite and the priests. The meeting is chaired by the granman who does not speak directly to the people, but always via a momboor who speaks on his behalf. The granman may not be addressed directly either. All villagers are allowed to participate regardless of age or gender, however the elderly carry the highest weight.

Once a year, the granman and his kabitens have to present themselves at the Government in Paramaribo.

Succession
The granman is normally chosen from the same lo (maternal group) and therefore a son can never succeed his father. The successor is chosen from the cousins on the maternal side. The succession is a lengthy process. More than a year must pass before the rituals and ceremonies are performed, and a successor is chosen by the people.

Basiyas and kabitens were normally chosen by the tribe, however political appointments have increased in frequency. The issue has caused diplomatic rifts in the past. In Augustus 1965, before the independence of Suriname, Prime-minister Pengel travelled to Diitabiki to install Gazon Matodya as the new granman, because Gazon was the most likely candidate, and Akontu Velanti had died one year ago. The visit was not appreciated, because the Ndyuka had to choose their own leader, and it was still too early to make a decision. Gazon was also of the opinion that the inauguration ought to be performed by Governor de Vries on behalf of Queen Juliana.

The six Maroon granman

Ndyuka granman

The Ndyuka granman is elected from the Otoo matriclan or lo and resides in Diitabiki. The current granman is Bono Velantie, who was installed on 17 March 2015.

The Ndyuka and Saramaka distinguish not only the lo of a person, but also the bee. Every lo consists of multiple bees who have arrived from the same plantation or ancestral mother. The bee forms a segment of 50 to 100 people who are joined together with common practices and rules, but who are often spread out over multiple villages.

Saramaka granman

The Saramaka granman resides in Asidonhopo. The succession of granman Belfon Aboikoni, who died in June 2014, has not been decided as of 2020. There are three candidates, but no agreement between the clans. The decision was forwarded to President Dési Bouterse in 2018, however he decided that the clans have to reach a compromise themselves. On 12 August 2018,  was appointed Granman, however the appointment is considered controversial.

Matawai granman

The Matawai granman resides in Pusugrunu. The current granman is Lesley Valentijn.

Aluku granman

The Aluku granman used to reside in Papaïchton. In 1992, there were two granman installed, Paul Doudou who was granman in Papaïchton until his death in 2014, and Joachim-Joseph Adochini who was chosen by election, and not part of maternal lineage. Adochini resides in Maripasoula.

Unlike the other tribes who are located in Suriname, the Aluku are French citizens. There is a village of located in Suriname called Cottica which is governed by a kabiten who is not under the authority of the granman.

The granman of the Aluku is not only a generic tribal chief, but also an arbiter who decides on issues concerning different maternal lineages. No appeal is possible, once a decision has been reached. In practice, his power is limited, because every individual has the right to make their own decisions.

Paramaka granman

The Paramaka granman resides in Langatabiki. The current granman is Jozef Misajere Forster.

Kwinti granman

The Kwinti granman resides in Witagron. Granman André Mathias died in 2018.

Brooskampers kabiten

There was a seventh group of Maroons called Brooskampers (also: Bakabusi Nengre). In the 1740s, they lived in the swamps near Surnau Creek. On 2 September 1863, a peace treaty was signed offering the tribe the abandoned plantations Klaverblad and Rorac. No granman was appointed, and the tribe was led by a kabiten (captain). Bauxite was discovered on the plantation. In 1917, a deal was negotiated with the tribe by kabiten Hudukanti and Alcoa, the lands were sold, and the people settled in Tout-Lui-Faut near Paramaribo.

The indigenous granman

Tiriyó granman

Traditionally, there was no clear hierarchy in the Tiriyó tribe. In 1997, Asongo Alalaparu was appointed as first granman for Suriname.

Wayana granman

Traditionally, the Wayana did not recognise a form of leadership that transcended the village level. Contact with missionaries and state representatives started to change that, and the Surinamese, French, and Brazilian states preferred to centralise their dealings with the Wayana, and for this purpose installed captains, head captains and granman among the Wayana chief. As the concept of a paramount chief goes against Wayana ideas of political organisation, the authority of these chiefs beyond their own villages is often limited.

The granman of the Wayana in Suriname resides in Pïlëuwimë, which is also known as Apetina, after the name of the first granman Kananoe Apetina, who was recognized by governor Jan Klaasesz as granman of the Wayana in 1952.

Apart from the granman in Pïlëuwimë, the Wayana on the Surinamese side of the Lawa River have their own head captain residing in Kawemhakan, who is also often referred to as granman.

The granman of the Wayana in French Guiana resides in Kulumuli, which is also known by the name of the first granman Twenkë. After Twenkë's he was succeeded by his son Amaipotï.

Notes

References
 
 
 
 
 
 
 
 
 
 NIKOS: Pamaka Ontwikkelingsplan. Paramaribo, 2016.

 
Titles of national or ethnic leadership